Louis Spohr's String Quartet No. 18 ("Quatuor brillant") in B minor, Op. 61, is one of eight such works the composer wrote between 1806 and 1835, and was published about 1824. Like a concerto, the work is designed to display a soloist's skills, but in a more intimate setting than the concert hall.

Movements
This quartet is in three movement form:
Allegro moderato
Adagio
Allegretto

References

External links

18
Compositions in B minor